Eric Lambin (born 23 September 1962) is a Belgian geographer. He is a professor at the Université catholique de Louvain and Stanford University.

From 1999 to 2005, he was Chair of the Land Use and Land Cover Change (LUCC).

In July 2019, Lambin received the 2019 Blue Planet Prize for a research project which cross-referenced satellite data with the socioeconomic class of the areas it came from. The intent of the research was to find and highlight the impact of economic globalization on local ecosystems and their residents, and found that reforestation in one area of the world corresponded to an increased timber industry in others.

Publications 
In addition to numerous scientific articles, he has published two books intended for a wider audience:
 La Terre sur un fil, éditions Le Pommier, 2004 - rééd. 2010
 The Middle Path, English translation, University of Chicago Press
 Une écologie du bonheur, éditions Le Pommier, 2009
 coauteur, Psychologie positive, le bonheur dans tous ses états, éditions Jouvence
 Le consommateur planétaire, éditions Le Pommier, 2015

References

Belgian geographers
1962 births
Living people